The 2002–03 season was Stoke City's 96th season in the Football League and the 36th in the second tier.

Stoke now back in the First Division appointed young manager Steve Cotterill prior to the start of the season. Cotterill had got an impressive reputation following his success with Cheltenham Town but after just 13 matches in charge he shocked the club by quitting in favour of becoming assistant manager at Sunderland. Dave Kevan took over as caretaker until Tony Pulis was appointed in November. His task was to ensure Stoke survived which looked a tough ask as Stoke went 16 matches without a win and when Stoke did manage to get a positive result they lost 6–0 at Nottingham Forest. Following that defeat Pulis improved his defence and results were slowly being ground out and it went to the final day of the season against Reading, with Stoke knowing that if they win they will stay up and thanks to Ade Akinbiyi they won 1–0 and finished four points above the relegation zone.

Season review

League
With Gudjon Thordarson failing to gain a new contract the Stoke board moved to appoint Steve Cotterill from Cheltenham Town. Cotterill was seen as one of the best young managers in the country and it was hoped that he would be a long term appointment. He brought in Chris Greenacre a striker from Mansfield Town where he had been a prolific goalscorer. The season started with a 0–0 draw away at Sheffield Wednesday and their first win came at home to Bradford City. This was followed by a 4–3 defeat at Preston North End and defeats by Derby and Burnley. Stoke then went five matches unbeaten to lift them away from danger but the club was shocked on 10 October 2002 as Cotterill quit the club in favour of becoming assistant manager at Sunderland.

Dave Kevan assumed a caretaker manager role and in his four matches in charge Stoke lost them all to start a worrying run of results. The board had expected to appoint George Burley as manager but somewhat surprisingly Tony Pulis was the man given the job. Pulis had previously turned down the chance to manage the club in 1999 and his appointment was not a popular one with the supporters. In his first match in charge away at Walsall he received a less than warm welcome and Stoke crashed to a 4–2 defeat. It took Pulis' team nine more matches to register a victory and after it looked as though Stoke could start pulling away from relegation they suffered humiliation by losing 6–0 at Nottingham Forest and the survival bid looked grim.

But Pulis signed a number of players on loan which included Ade Akinbiyi, Paul Warhurst, Lee Mills, and goalkeepers Steve Banks and Mark Crossley. Pulis made Stoke a difficult team to beat and after three hard-fought goalless draws against teams trying to gain promotion Stoke gained vital victories against Watford, Rotherham United, Wimbledon and Coventry City. This took the relegation fight to the last day of the season with Stoke needing a victory against Reading to ensure their stay in First Division would be extended. A 55th-minute strike from Ade Akinbiyi sealed the win they needed and Stoke could start building for the future.

FA Cup
Two 3–0 wins against Wigan Athletic and Bournemouth set up a tie against Premier League Chelsea and two second half goals gave the Londoners a 2–0 victory.

League Cup
Stoke lost in the first round to Bury 1–0 at Gigg Lane.

Final league table

Results
Stoke's score comes first

Legend

Pre-Season Friendlies

Football League First Division

FA Cup

League Cup

Squad statistics

References

Stoke City F.C. seasons
Stoke City